Bottcher or Böttcher is a German surname. Notable people with the surname include:

 Albrecht Böttcher (born 1954), German mathematician
 Arthur Böttcher (1831–1889), German pathologist  and anatomist
 August Friedrich Böttcher (1825–1900), insect dealer in Berlin
 Bas Böttcher (born 1974), German slam poet
 Brendan Bottcher (born 1991), Canadian curler
 Champ Boettcher (1900–1965), American football player
 Charles Boettcher (1852–1948), German-born Colorado businessman and philanthropist
 Curt Boettcher (1944–1987), American singer, songwriter, musician and record producer
 Grit Boettcher (born 1938), German actress
 Günter Böttcher (1954–2012), West German handball player
 Herman Bottcher (1909–1944), American soldier born in Germany
 Hermann Böttcher (1866–1935), German stage and film actor
 Jürgen Böttcher (born 1931), German film director and painter
 Karl Böttcher (1886–1974), German general
 Lucjan Böttcher (1872–1937), Polish mathematician
 Markus Böttcher (born 1964), German television actor
 Martin Böttcher (1927–2019), German composer and conductor
 Maximilian Böttcher (1872–1950), German writer
 Mike Boettcher (born 1954), American journalist and war correspondent
 Paul Böttcher (1912–1998), highly decorated lieutenant in the Wehrmacht during World War I
 Wolfgang Boettcher (1935–2021), German classical cellist

See also 
 Böttcher America, subsidiary of the German firm Felix Böttcher GmbH
 Boettcher Memorial Tropical Conservatory
 Boettcher cell
 Böttcher's equation and function
 Helena Boettcher, athlete
 Boettcher Concert Hall
 Boettcher Scholarship

German-language surnames
Occupational surnames